Fit testing may refer to:

 Fecal immunochemical testing
 Hearing protection fit-testing
 Respirator fit test